Badminton at the 2014 Asian Games was held in Gyeyang Gymnasium, Incheon, South Korea from 20 September to 29 September 2014.

Singles, doubles, and team events were contested for both men and women. Mixed Doubles were also contested.

Schedule

Medalists

Medal table

Participating nations
A total of 221 athletes from 19 nations competed in badminton at the 2014 Asian Games:

References

External links
Official website

 
2014
2014 Asian Games events
Asian Games
2014 Asian Games